This list of large scale temperature reconstructions of the last 2,000 years includes climate reconstructions which have contributed significantly to the modern consensus on the temperature record of the past 2,000 years.

The instrumental temperature record only covers the last 150 years at a hemispheric or global scale, and reconstructions of earlier periods are based on climate proxies. In an early attempt to show that climate had changed, Hubert Lamb's 1965 paper generalised from temperature records of central England together with historical, botanical and archeological evidence to produce a qualitative estimate of temperatures in the north Atlantic region. Subsequent quantitative reconstructions used statistical techniques with various climate proxies to produce larger scale reconstructions. Tree ring proxies can give an annual resolution of extratropical regions of the northern hemisphere, and can be statistically combined with other sparser proxies to  produce multiproxy hemispherical or global reconstructions.

Quantitative reconstructions have consistently shown earlier temperatures below the temperature levels reached in the late 20th century.

List of reconstructions in order of publication
 “Civilization and Climate”.
  "The early medieval warm epoch and its sequel".
  "Simulated northern hemisphere temperature departures 1579–1880".
  "Reconstructed Northern Hemisphere annual temperature since 1671 based on high-latitude tree-ring data from North America".
  "Little Ice Age summer temperature variations; their nature and relevance to recent global warming trends".
  "Was there a ‘medieval warm period’, and if so, where and when?".
  "Global interdecadal and century-scale climate oscillations during the past five centuries".
  "Arctic Environmental Change of the Last Four Centuries".
  "High resolution reconstructed Northern Hemisphere temperatures for the last few centuries: using regional average tree ring, ice core and historical annual time series".

Cited in IPCC TAR
The IPCC Third Assessment Report (TAR WG1) of 2001 cited the following reconstructions supporting its conclusion that the 1990s was likely to have been the warmest Northern Hemisphere decade for 1,000 years:
  "Global-scale temperature patterns and climate forcing over the past six centuries"
  "High-resolution palaeoclimatic records for the last millennium: interpretation, integration and comparison with General Circulation Model control-run temperatures".
  "Climate change record in subsurface temperatures: A global perspective".
  "Northern hemisphere temperatures during the past millennium: Inferences, uncertainties, and limitations".
  "Annual climate variability in the Holocene: interpreting the message of ancient trees".
  "How Warm Was the Medieval Warm Period?".

Cited in NRC Report (North Report)
 highlighted six recent reconstructions, one of which was not cited in AR4:
   "Temperature trends over the past five centuries reconstructed from borehole temperatures"

Cited in IPCC AR4
The IPCC Fourth Assessment Report (AR4 WG1) of 2007 cited the following reconstructions in support of its conclusion that the 20th century was likely to have been the warmest in the Northern Hemisphere for at least 1,300 years:
 Jones et al. (1998) [also in TAR], calibrated by  "The Evolution of Climate Over the Last Millennium".
 Mann, Bradley & Hughes (1999) [also in TAR]
 Briffa (2000) [also in TAR], calibrated by  "Large-scale temperature inferences from tree rings: a review".
 Crowley & Lowery 2000 "How Warm Was the Medieval Warm Period?" [also in TAR]
  "Low-frequency temperature variations from a northern tree ring density network".
  "Low-Frequency Signals in Long Tree-Ring Chronologies for Reconstructing Past Temperature Variability", recalibrated by  "Extra-tropical Northern Hemisphere land temperature variability over the past 1000 years".
  "Global surface temperatures over the past two millennia."
  "Borehole climate reconstructions: Spatial structure and hemispheric averages".
  "Extracting a climate signal from 169 glacier records".
  "Proxy-based Northern Hemisphere surface temperature reconstructions: Sensitivity to method, predictor network, target season, and target domain".
  "Highly variable Northern Hemisphere temperatures reconstructed from low- and high-resolution proxy data".
  "On the long-term context for late twentieth century warming".
  "The spatial extent of 20th-century warmth in the context of the past 1200 years".
  "Climate sensitivity constrained by temperature reconstructions over the past seven centuries".

Cited in IPCC AR5
The IPCC Fifth Assessment Report (AR5 WG1) of 2013 examined temperature variations during the last two millennia, and cited the following reconstructions in support of its conclusion that for average annual Northern Hemisphere temperatures, "the period 1983–2012 was very likely the warmest 30-year period of the last 800 years (high confidence) and likely the warmest 30-year period of the last 1400 years (medium confidence)":
 Pollack and Smerdon (2004) [also in AR4]
 Moberg et al. (2005) [also in AR4]
 D'Arrigo, Wilson & Jacoby (2006) [also in AR4]
 Frank, Esper & Cook (2007)  "Adjustment for proxy number and coherence in a large-scale temperature reconstruction".
 Hegerl et al. (2007) "Detection of human influence on a new, validated 1500–year temperature reconstruction".
  "Millennial temperature reconstruction intercomparison and evaluation".
 Loehle & McCulloch (2008) "Correction to: A 2000-year global temperature reconstruction based on non-tree ring proxies".
  "Proxy-based reconstructions of hemispheric and global surface temperature variations over the past two millennia".
  "Global Signatures and Dynamical Origins of the Little Ice Age and Medieval Climate Anomaly".
  "A New Reconstruction of Temperature Variability in the Extra-Tropical Northern Hemisphere During the Last Two Millennia".
  "The extra-tropical Northern Hemisphere temperature in the last two millennia: Reconstructions of low-frequency variability".
 Leclercq & Oerlemans (2012) "Global and Hemispheric temperature reconstruction from glacier length fluctuations".
 "Northern Hemisphere temperature reconstruction during the last millennium using multiple annual proxies".

Further reconstructions
 "Reconstructing hemispheric-scale climates from multiple stalagmite records".
  "Evaluation of proxy-based millennial reconstruction methods".
  "A late Quaternary climate reconstruction based on borehole heat flux data, borehole temperature data, and the instrumental record"
  "Recent warming reverses long-term arctic cooling".
  "A Bayesian Algorithm for Reconstructing Climate Anomalies in Space and Time".
  "Reconstruction of the Extratropical NH Mean Temperature over the Last Millennium with a Method that Preserves Low-Frequency Variability".
  "Northern Hemisphere temperature patterns in the last 12 centuries".
 "A Reconstruction of Regional and Global Temperature for the Past 11,300 Years"
 (78 researchers, corresponding author Darrell S. Kaufman) "Continental-scale temperature variability during the past two millennia"
Raphael Neukom, Nathan Steiger, Juan José Gómez-Navarro, Jianghao Wang & Johannes P. Werner 2019 "No evidence for globally coherent warm and cold periods over the preindustrial Common Era" 
PAGES 2k Consortium 2019 "Consistent multidecadal variability in global temperature reconstructions and simulations over the Common Era"

Notes

References in chronological sequence

1915

1965

1979

1989

1990 

.
1993 

1994
 
1995

1996

 pdf
1997

1998
  Corrigendum: 

1999

.
2000

2001



2002

2003

2004

2005
. Corrigendum:  date=2011-03-07

2006

, Figure 1
. (North Report)
2007

 
2008

2009

2010

 "ICCER"

2011
 (reply to comments by A. Moberg)
2012

2013
 
 

  (78 researchers, corresponding author Darrell S. Kaufman)
 pdf

Large scale temperature reconstructions of the last 2,000 years
Historical climatology
Hockey stick controversy